Wounded is the debut full-length album by Landmine Marathon. Originally released in 2006 via Level Plane Records, the album was re-released on black and clear green 12-inch vinyl in 2011 via Prosthetic Records, in runs of 60 and 14 units respectively.

Shortly after the album's release, Ryan Butler was added to the band as guitarist, replacing the position of Eric Saylor.

Track listing
 "25th Hour" – 3:35
 "Crisscross Thoughts" – 4:13
 "Dying Days" – 2:38
 "Thunder Blasted Bodies" – 3:13
 "Muscles Crown" – 2:44
 "White Widows" – 0:44
 "Fubar" – 1:26
 [untitled] – 1:54
 "Time Movement" – 2:28

Personnel
Grace Perry – vocals
Mike Waldron – guitar
Eric Saylor – guitar
Matt Martinez – bass guitar and vocals
Mike Pohlmeier – drums

Production and design
Dave Shirk – mastering
Robb Smigelski – visual layout
Neal Winter – band photography

References

2006 debut albums
Landmine Marathon albums
Level Plane Records albums